The Mamiya 645 camera systems are a series of medium format film and digital cameras and lenses manufactured by Mamiya and its successors. They are called "645" because they use the nominal 6 cm x 4.5 cm film size from 120 roll film.  They came in three major generations: first-generation manual-focus film cameras, second-generation manual-focus film cameras, and autofocus film/digital cameras.

Mamiya 645 Manual Focus System

Mamiya 645 manual focus cameras 
All seven of the manual-focus Mamiya 645 cameras can use the same lenses and film inserts (film spools). The two generations use different viewfinders, grips, and other accessories that are not always cross-compatible.

First Generation 

 The M645 was manufactured from 1975 to 1987. This was the first model to offer a 6x4.5 cm frame, allowing 15 shots on a standard 120 roll film. The M645 was a true system camera, with interchangeable viewfinders and lenses. It used an electronically controlled cloth focal plane shutter offering speeds of 8 seconds to 1/500 second in one-stop increments. The camera featured a mirror lockup, as well as selectable multi-exposure. Film was carried in cartridges that could be pre-loaded, but no capability existed to allow changing of film magazines mid-roll. A waist-level non-metered finder was available, as well as a non-metered pentaprism and three varieties of through-the-lens (TTL) metered prisms (CdS, PD and AE). The metered prisms read the aperture dial through a mechanical coupling on the lens. The standard lens was the 80mm f/2.8 C or the 70mm f/2.8 C E or the 80mm f/1.9 C.
 The M645 1000S was manufactured from 1976 to 1990. This camera added a 1/1000 second shutter speed to the M645, as well as a self-timer and a depth-of-field preview lever. The standard lens was the 80mm f/2.8 C or the 80mm f/1.9 C.
 The M645J was manufactured from 1979 to 1982. This was a stripped-down version of the M645, with the mirror lockup knob and second shutter button removed. The standard lens was the 80mm f/2.8 C or the 80mm f/1.9 C.

Second Generation 

 The Mamiya 645 Super was manufactured from 1985 to 1993. This was a new camera with a molded plastic shell on a diecast metal frame. Its features are the same as the M645 1000s, but it added removable film backs, whereby a dark-slide could be inserted and the back removed mid-roll. The standard lens was the 80mm f/2.8 N, or the 80mm f/1.9 C (early) or the 80mm f/1.9 N (late).
 The Mamiya 645 Pro was manufactured from 1993 to 1998.  It added a self-timer and a smoother styling. The standard lens was the 80mm f/2.8 N or the 80mm f/1.9 N.
 The Mamiya 645 Pro-TL was manufactured from 1997 to 2006 and is functionally similar to the 645 Pro but adds through-the-lens flash metering. The standard lens was the 80mm f/2.8 N or the 80mm f/1.9 N.
 The Mamiya 645E was first released in 2000. This was an entry-level version of the M645 Pro without switchable backs or viewfinders.  It did have a light meter built in to the viewfinder, however. The standard lens was the 80mm f/2.8 N or the 80mm f/1.9 N.

Mamiya 645 Manual-Focus Lenses 

The Mamiya 645 Manual-Focus lenses will work on all manual-focus bodies.  They will also work on autofocus bodies such as the Mamiya 645AF, Mamiya 645DF and Phase One 645DF, but manual-focus lenses will require light metering after the lens has been stopped down, unlike native autofocus lenses.  Third-party adapters exist to use these manual-focus lenses on Nikon F mount, Canon EF mount, and other cameras.  These lenses will not work on the Phase One XF unless modified.  All Mamiya 645 lenses are multi-coated.  Nearly all have curved aperture blades, rendering smooth backgrounds at wider aperture settings.

The internal shutter in the first-generation 645 bodies only supported flash synchronization at 1/60th of a second. This made outdoors fill flash difficult, and so some lenses were equipped with a built-in leaf shutter which supported flash synchronization at all speeds up to 1/500th of a second. Leaf shutter lenses had a separate PC socket. In order to take advantage of the faster speeds the internal shutter had to be fired at 1/30th of a second or slower.

Lens abbreviations 

 A or APO — the lens has an apochromatic (or near-apochromatic) design
 C — the lens is stamped “Sekor C” on the lens barrel.  All manual-focus lenses for Mamiya 645 are Sekor C lenses, which Mamiya used to designate multi-coated lenses.
 E — only for the 70mm f/2.8 E lens sold as a kit with the original M645, apparently late in the M645's production run to differentiate it from the leaf-shutter version.
 Macro — the lens is optimized for close focusing and close-up (macro) photography
 N — the lens has a "new" cosmetic design. "N" lenses were launched with the second generation manual-focus cameras.  Many "N" lenses are the same as their prior "C" or "S" lens version, but have changes to the lens coatings and a plastic aperture ring instead of metal.  Some "C" lenses received a cosmetic update (removal of the chrome on the focus ring) but were not otherwise changed and did not receive a "N" marking, such as the 50mm f/4.5 and 500mm f/5.6.  "N" lenses may also be called "CN" lenses.
N/L — the lens has the "new" cosmetic design and an integrated Leaf Shutter.  When used with the optional power drive WG-401 on second generation bodies, the leaf shutters are automatically cocked.  On first generation bodies, or without the power drive, the leaf shutters must be cocked manually.
 S — the lens is a revised version of a "C" lens.  The only lenses with "S" versions are the 45mm f/2.8 and 55mm f/2.8 (both with different optical formulas and dimensions than their predecessors), but other accessories have "S" versions, including the Waist-level Finder W, the Prism Viewfinder PD, and the #3 extension tube.  Early "S" lenses may have gold "S" stickers on them, while later "S" lenses may have the "S" engraved.  "S" lenses may also be called "CS" lenses.
 SF — the lens has a separate control ring to create a Soft Focus effect.
 ULD — the lens has “ultra low dispersion” glass in its design
 Zoom — the lens has a variable focal length

Lens table 

* Lens with multiple versions are combined to save space.  In the "Versions" column, the versions are separated by commas.  For example, the 210mm had two versions, the original "C" and the updated "N".

** Note that different tests have different testing procedures, and that this information is not necessarily a good indication of overall lens performance.  Please see the references for the full reviews.

Mamiya 645 Manual Focus Accessories

Viewfinders — First Generation 

* when used with 80mm f/1.9 lens and 100 ISO film

** early version has silver "Mamiya" logo on the front, later version has silver "Mamiya 645" logo on front.

Viewfinder Accessories — First Generation 

 Focusing screen No. 1 — microprism (standard screen with a microprism circle in the center)
 Focusing screen No. 2 — matte (for close-up work, just a ground glass, no focusing aid)
 Focusing screen No. 3 — checker/grid (like the matte screen, but with grid lines)
 Focusing screen No. 4 — rangefinder spot (a classic horizontal split-image rangefinder focusing screen)
 Focusing screen No. 5 — rangefinder spot with microprism (a 45-degree-angle split image rangefinder surrounded by a microprism area) - Standard on most models
 Magnifier (finder extension) for P, PD, PD S, CdS viewfinders
 Right-angle finder for P, PD, CdS viewfinders
 Right-angle finder 2 for P, PD, PD S, CdS viewfinders
 Diopter corrections (magnifiers) for P, PD, PD S, CdS viewfinders (-3 to +3)
 Diopter corrections (magnifiers) for W viewfinder (-3 to +2)

Film inserts — First Generation 

 120 film insert (can be used with both generations)
 220 film insert (can be used with both generations)

Grips and Auto-winders — First Generation 

 Pistol rubber handgrip with no shutter trigger
 Pistol plastic handgrip with shutter trigger
 Power drive grip (right hand) with shutter trigger — provides automatic film advance
 Standard L-grip (left hand) with no shutter trigger
 Deluxe L-grip (left hand) with shutter trigger and accessory shoe
 Flash gun adapter (similar shape to L-grip)
Film advance knob or crank

Other accessories — First Generation 

 Extension tube #1 - 11.8mm
 Extension tube #2 - 23.6mm
 Extension tube #3, Extension tube #3S - 35.4mm
 Auto macro spacer 2x - when used with 80mm f/4 Macro lens, increases magnification from 1:2 to 1:1
 Auto bellows
 Balloon bellows
 Slide copier attachment and slide carriers
 Focus handle (attaches to lens)
 Reversing ring RS58 for bellows (fits 58 mm filter-thread)
 Reversing ring RS67 for bellows (fits 67 mm filter thread)
 Tripod quick-shoe system
 Lens filters and hoods
 Bellows-style lens hood
 Hand and neck straps
 Aluminum traveling case branded with Mamiya logo, and smaller leather cases
 Adapter ZE (for Mamiya 35mm SLRs)

Viewfinders — Second Generation 

* when used with 80mm f/1.9 lens and 100 ISO film

Viewfinder Accessories — Second Generation 

 Focusing screen N type A — matte
 Focusing screen N type A4 — checker/grid
 Focusing screen N type B — rangefinder spot
 Focusing screen N type C — microprism spot
 Focusing screen N type E — rangefinder spot with microprism
 Magnifier N for prism N, AE N viewfinders
 Angle finder N for prism N, AE N viewfinders
 Diopter corrections for prism N, AE N viewfinders
 Magnifying lenses for W N viewfinder

Camera backs / inserts — Second Generation 

 120 film insert (can be used with both generations)
 220 film insert (can be used with both generations)
 120 roll film back HA401 (second generation only)
 220 roll film back HB401 (second generation only)
 135 roll film back HC401 and special type E focusing screen (second generation only)
 Polaroid pack film holder HP401

Grips and Auto-winders — Second Generation 

 Advance crank AC401
 Power winder grip WG401 (Super)
 Power winder grip WG402 (Pro and Pro TL)
 Left-hand grip GL401
 Flash bracket AD401

Other accessories — Second Generation 

 2x Teleconverter N
 Auto bellows N (includes double cable release)
Various straps and cases (N models)
 All of the "Other accessories" listed above for First-generation systems can also be used

Mamiya 645 Autofocus System 

The Mamiya 645 Autofocus (AF) system was launched in 1999 with the 645AF.  It was a departure from the previous manual system, in that the finders and grips were no longer detachable and interchangeable.  It still used the same lens mount, but the new autofocus lenses did not have an aperture ring; rather, the lens aperture was controlled by dials on the camera.  Manual-focus lenses could still be used on the autofocus cameras, but not vice versa.  If manual focus lenses are used, the lens aperture must be set before metering the scene (known as "stop-down metering") which made the manual-focus lenses of limited usefulness compared to the newer autofocus lenses.

Mamiya 645 auto focus cameras 

 Mamiya 645AF (1999) — Similar to 645 Pro TL, but power winder and AE prism finder are both built in. Maximum shutter speed increases to 1/4000, and minimum shutter speed improves to 30 seconds, while flash sync improves to 1/125.  Autofocus is implemented with single-focus, continuous-focus, and manual focus modes.  Takes 120/220 film backs only
 Mamiya 645AFD (2001) — Added communication interface for digital backs, otherwise similar to the 645AF.
 Mamiya 645AFD II (2005) — Updated version of 645AFD with minor changes.
 Mamiya 645AFD III (Phase One 645AF) (2008) — Updated version of 645AFD II with minor changes.
 Mamiya 645DF (Phase One 645DF) (2009) — A completely new camera, but it uses the same lenses as the rest of the Mamiya 645 AF system.  It supports digital backs only (no film backs)
 Mamiya 645DF+ (Phase One 645DF+) (2012-current) — A minor update of the 645DF with reworked internals for higher reliability.  Supports more than 50 different digital backs and 80 different lenses, including native Mamiya lenses and Hasselblad V lenses.

Mamiya ZD series cameras 

 Mamiya ZD (2004) — fixed-back medium-format DSLR.  The same 22 megapixel sensor was also available in the ZD Back.

Mamiya 645 Autofocus Lenses

Lens abbreviations 

 AF — the lens has autofocus
 APO — the lens has an apochromatic design
 Asph — the lens has aspherical element(s)
 D — the lens is optimized for digital sensors (even if still manually-focused)
 IF — the lens has internal focusing
 LS — the lens has a Leaf shutter integrated into the lens
 M (Macro) — the lens is optimized for close focusing and close-up (macro) photography
 SK — the lens is co-branded as a Schneider-Kreuznach lens
 ULD — the lens has "ultra low dispersion" glass used in its design
Zoom — the lens has a variable focal length

Some Mamiya 645 AF lenses are also sold as Phase One lenses. Phase One also sells Schneider-Kreuznach lenses, which are also branded as Mamiya.  See the history of Mamiya for more information.

Mamiya 645 AF System Accessories 

 V-Grip Air GB401 - for shooting comfortably in portrait mode
 Dual charger - for dual battery charging
 External battery case PE401
 Schneider-Kreuznach 2x teleconverter - AF lenses will become manual focus
 Angle finder FA401 - 360 degree rotatable angle finder
 Magnifier FD402 - for macro and telephoto work
 Auto extension tubes NA401, NA402, NA403 - for macro work
 Auto bellows NC401 with reversing ring - for macro work
 Cable Releases - RE401 (1m long) and RE402 (5m long)
 Adapters for RB67 and RZ67 bodies - to attach DM digital back to RB67 or RZ67 body
 Remote control unit RS402
 Various flash accessories for Metz flashes
 Various lens hoods including bellows-style
 Various focusing screens (up to eight options depending on the camera body)
 Carbon-fiber tripod, monopod, and tripod head system
 Aluminum carrying case and other cases
Hasselblad V lens mount adapters (black #HBB NR404 800-53200A, and silver #HBW NR405 800-53400A)

See also 
 Mamiya
 List of Mamiya Products
Medium format (film)
120 film

References

External links 

 Pacific Rim Cameras Reference Library - includes many pieces of Mamiya sales literature, manuals, and documents
 Ian B Foto Downloads page - includes many Mamiya instruction manuals and brochures
 Butkus.org - includes many Mamiya manuals and documents

Mamiya SLR cameras
120 film cameras
Digital cameras